Coradion is a genus of marine ray-finned fish in the family Chaetodontidae, the butterflyfishes. They are native to the Indian and Pacific Oceans.

Species
There are currently four recognized species in this genus:
 Coradion altivelis McCulloch, 1916 – highfin coralfish
 Coradion calendula Matsunuma, Motomura & Seah, 2023
 Coradion chrysozonus (G. Cuvier, 1831) – goldengirdled coralfish
 Coradion melanopus (G. Cuvier, 1831) – twospot coralfish

References

 
Chaetodontidae
Taxa named by Johann Jakob Kaup
Marine fish genera